Prince of Ning may refer to:

Li Chengqi (679–742), Tang dynasty prince, known as Prince of Ning after 719
Zhu Quan (朱權, 1378-1448), 17th son of Emperor Ming Hongwu
Zhu Chenhao (朱宸濠, died 1521), leader of the Prince of Ning rebellion

See also 
 Prince of Ning rebellion